Coryphospingus is a small genus of finch-like tanagers found in South America. Coryphospingus was formerly classified in the family Emberizidae along with the buntings and American sparrows.

Taxonomy and species list
The genus Coryphospingus was introduced in 1851 by the German ornithologist Jean Cabanis. The type species was designated as the red pileated finch by the English zoologist George Robert Gray in 1855. The genus name combines the Ancient Greek koruphē meaning "crown of the head" with spingos meaning "finch". The genus contains two species.

References

 
Bird genera